Dangshan County is a county in the far north of Anhui Province, China. It is under the administration of Suzhou city. It is famous for fruits (pear, peach, plum and watermelon).

Administrative divisions
Dangshan County administers 13 towns and 3 other township-level divisions.

Towns 
Dangshan County's 13 towns are as follows:

Other township-level divisions 
Dangshan County has the following 3 areas which function as township-level divisions:

Climate

Economy 
Dangshan calls itself "China's pear capital", and is home to the ‘Dangshan Su’ pear variety. Pears and other fruits are canned and juiced, both domestically and for export.

A disabled young woman entrepreneur has increased local pear sales by selling online.

Transportation 
The Dangshan South railway station of the Zhengzhou–Xuzhou high-speed railway opened in 2016.

References 

 
County-level divisions of Anhui
Suzhou, Anhui